John Dickson (15 May 1949 – 1998) was a Scottish professional footballer who played as a forward.

Career
Born in Kirkcaldy, Dickson played for Lochore Welfare, Cowdenbeath, St Mirren, Ayr United, Elgin City, East Fife and Dundonald Bluebell.

References

1949 births
1998 deaths
Scottish footballers
Lochore Welfare F.C. players
Cowdenbeath F.C. players
St Mirren F.C. players
Ayr United F.C. players
Elgin City F.C. players
East Fife F.C. players
Dundonald Bluebell F.C. players
Scottish Football League players
Association football forwards
Date of death missing